Public relations (PR) is the practice of managing and disseminating information from an individual or an organization (such as a business, government agency, or a nonprofit organization) to the public in order to influence their perception. Public relations and publicity differ in that PR is controlled internally, whereas publicity is not controlled and contributed by external parties. Public relations may include an organization or individual gaining exposure to their audiences using topics of public interest and news items that do not require direct payment. The exposure mostly is media-based. This differentiates it from advertising as a form of marketing communications. Public relations aims to create or obtain coverage for clients for free, also known as earned media, rather than paying for marketing or advertising also known as paid media. But in the early 21st century, advertising is also a part of broader PR activities.

An example of good public relations would be generating an article featuring a PR firm's client, rather than paying for the client to be advertised next to the article. The aim of public relations is to inform the public, prospective customers, investors, partners, employees, and other stakeholders, and persuade them to maintain a positive or favorable view about the organization, its leadership, products, or political decisions. Public relations professionals typically work for PR and marketing firms, businesses and companies, government, and public officials as public information officers and nongovernmental organizations, and nonprofit organizations. Jobs central to public relations include internal positions such as public relations coordinator, public relations specialist, public relations manager, and outside agency positions such as account coordinator, account executive, account supervisor, and media relations manager.

Public relations specialists establish and maintain relationships with an organization's target audience, the media, relevant trade media, and other opinion leaders. Common responsibilities include designing communications campaigns, writing press releases and other content for news, working with the press, arranging interviews for company spokespeople, writing speeches for company leaders, acting as an organization's spokesperson, preparing clients for press conferences, media interviews and speeches, writing website and social media content, managing company reputation (crisis management), managing internal communications, and marketing activities like brand awareness and event management. Success in the field of public relations requires a deep understanding of the interests and concerns of each of the company's many stakeholders. The public relations professional must know how to effectively address those concerns using the most powerful tool of the public relations trade, which is publicity.

Definitions
Ivy Lee, the man who turned around the Rockefeller name and image, and his friend, Edward Louis Bernays, established the first definition of public relations in the early 20th century as follows: "a management function, which tabulates public attitudes, defines the policies, procedures and interests of an organization... followed by executing a program of action to earn public understanding and acceptance." However, when Lee was later asked about his role in a hearing with the United Transit Commission, he said "I have never been able to find a satisfactory phrase to describe what I do." In 1948, historian Eric Goldman noted that the definition of public relations in Webster's would be "disputed by both practitioners and critics in the field."

According to Bernays, the public relations counsel is the agent working with both modern media of communications and group formations of society in order to provide ideas to the public's consciousness. Furthermore, he is also concerned with ideologies and courses of actions as well as material goods and services and public utilities and industrial associations and large trade groups for which it secures popular support.

In August 1978, the World Assembly of Public Relations Associations defined the field as "the art and social science of analyzing trends, predicting their consequences, counselling organizational leaders and implementing planned programs of action, which will serve both the organization and the public interest."

Public Relations Society of America, a professional trade association, defined public relations in 1982 as: "Public relations helps an organization and its publics adapt mutually to each other."

In 2011 and 2012, the PRSA solicited crowd supplied definitions for the term and allowed the public to vote on one of three finalists. The winning definition stated that: 
"Public relations is a strategic communication process that builds mutually beneficial relationships between organizations and their publics."

Public relations can also be defined as the practice of managing communication between an organization and its publics.

History

Public relations has historical roots pre-dating the 20th century. Most textbooks regard the establishment of the "Publicity Bureau" in Boston in 1900 as marking the founding of a public relations profession. Academics have found early forms of public influence and communications management in ancient civilizations. Aristotle's Rhetoric, for example, explains core foundations for persuasion. Evidence shows that it continued to evolve during the settling of the New World and during the movement to abolish slavery in England. Basil Clarke is considered the founder of public relations in the United Kingdom for his establishment of "Editorial Services" in 1924.

The United States, the United Kingdom, Germany, and others used the concept of propaganda, which later evolved into public relations, to rally domestic support and to demonize enemies during the World Wars (compare journalism). World War I (1914-1918), which affected not only military but whole populations, is considered to be "modern propaganda's launching pad". This led to more sophisticated commercial publicity efforts as public-relations talent entered the private sector. Most historians believe modern-day public relations was first established in the US by Ivy Lee (1877-1934) in 1903 when he started working as the image maker for and corporate advisor for Rockefeller. Edward Bernays (1891-1995), who handled the publicity of theatrical associations in 1913., then spread internationally. Meanwhile, in the nascent Soviet Russia of the 1920s, artists and poets (such as Mayakovsky) engaged in public-relations campaigns for various state agencies and causes (note for example Likbez).

Many American companies with PR departments spread the practice to Europe when they set up European subsidiaries in the wake of the Marshall plan of 1948–1952.

In the second half of the 20th century, public relations entered an era of professional development. Trade associations, PR news-magazines, international PR agencies, and academic principles for the profession were established. In the early 2000s, press-release services began offering social-media press releases. The Cluetrain Manifesto, which predicted the effect of social media in 1999, was controversial in its time, but by 2006 the effect of social media and new Internet technologies became broadly accepted by the general public.

Career prospects

United Kingdom
Cosmopolitan reported that the average annual salary for a "public relations director" was £77,619 in 2017. One notable former PR practitioner was former Prime Minister David Cameron.

United States

Education
Public relations practitioners typically have a bachelor's degree in journalism, communications, public relations, marketing, or English. Many senior practitioners have advanced degrees; a 2015 survey found that 40% of chief communications officers at Fortune 500 companies had master's degrees.

The Public Relations Society of America helps create diversity, professionalism, leadership, and networking for the members involved. In 2013, a survey of the 21,000 members of the Public Relations Society of America found that 18-percent held the Accreditation in Public Relations. Being a member of society is a way new public relations practitioners can develop skills needed for the rest of their career.

Salary
In 2019, a PR Week survey found a median annual compensation of $95,000 for public relations practitioners, with sector medians ranging from $85,000 in the non-profit sector, $96,000 in a private agency setting, and $126,000 in a for-profit corporation. The Bureau of Labor Statistics, meanwhile, reports the median annual for "public relations specialists" at $68,000 in 2017 and $114,000 for "public relations managers".

According to a study made by the U.S. Bureau of Labor Statistics in 2020, they found that public relations practitioners in the United States private sector – working at PR agencies – have a median salary of $57,940. Individuals that work within the federal sector have reported to be making a median income of $65,310. The information collected shows those that work for professional, labor, political, and similar organizations average $66,340 a year.

The C-level position of chief communications officer (CCO), used in some private companies, usually earned more than $220,000 annually as of 2013. CCOs at Fortune 200 companies, meanwhile, had an average compensation package of just over $1 million annually, according to a 2009 survey by Fortune; this amount included base salary, bonus, and stock options.
  
Within the U.S. federal government, public affairs workers had a 2016 average salary of approximately $101,922, with the U.S. Forest Service employing the most of such professionals. Of federal government agencies employing more than one public affairs worker, those at the Federal Aviation Administration earned the most, on average, at approximately $150,130. The highest-earning public affairs worker within the U.S. government, meanwhile, earned $229,333.

Salaries of public relations specialists in local government vary widely. The chief communications officer of the Utah Transit Authority earned $258,165 in total compensation in 2014 while an early career public information officer for the city of Conway, South Carolina had a pay range beginning at approximately $59,000 per year in 2017.

Canada

Indeed reported that the average annual salary for a "public relations manager" was $59,326 in June 2019. According to Stats Canada, there has been no growth in the demand for journalists in Canada, but the demand for PR practitioners continues to grow. Most journalists transition into public relations smoothly and bring a much-needed skill set to the profession.

Public relations practitioners typically have a bachelor's degree in communications, public relations, journalism, or English. Some senior practitioners have advanced degrees. The industry has seen an influx of journalists because newsrooms are in decline and the salaries tend to be higher.

A society that has been growing the careers of many public relations practitioners in Canada, is known as the CPRS. The CPRS, or the Canadian Public Relation Society, is an association in Canada that ensures public relations specialists are ethical, and progressive in their field of work. This association was founded in 1948 to regulate the way PR workers:

 Maintain professionalism
 Communicate
 Grow in their career

They also have to have the interest of society as a whole, and whoever will be affected by their media produced. Other than these fundamentals of the CPRS, they also introduced a code of ethics in 1961, where it supplies nine fundamental standards of ethics that members must uphold. CPRS Judicial and Ethics Committee, is set in place to oversee Public Relations members to ensure proper ethical communication. This association, like the Public Relations Society of America, helps young aspiring public relations practitioners grow their careers.

Tactics 
Public relations professionals present the face of an organization or individual, usually to articulate its objectives and official views on issues of relevance, primarily to the media. Public relations contributes to the way an organization is perceived by influencing the media and maintaining relationships with stakeholders. According to Dr. Jacquie L’Etang from Queen Margaret University, public relations professionals can be viewed as "discourse workers specializing in communication and the presentation of argument and employing rhetorical strategies to achieve managerial aims."

Specific public relations disciplines include:
 Financial public relations – communicating financial results and business strategy
 Consumer/lifestyle public relations – gaining publicity for a particular product or service
 Crisis communication – responding in a crisis
 Internal communications – communicating within the company itself
 Government relations – engaging government departments to influence public policy
 Media relations – a public relations function that involves building and maintaining close relationships with the news media so that they can sell and promote a business.
Social Media/Community Marketing - in today's climate, public relations professionals leverage social media marketing to distribute messages about their clients to desired target markets
In-house public relations – a public relations professional hired to manage press and publicity campaigns for the company that hired them.
'Black Hat PR' – manipulating public profiles under the guise of neutral commentators or voices or engaging to actively damage or undermine the reputations of the rival or targeted individuals or organizations.
Executive Visibility – a strategy used to grow an executive's presence and exposure in order to impact a company's success.

Building and managing relationships with those who influence an organization or individual's audiences have a central role in doing public relations. After a public relations practitioner has been working in the field, they accumulate a list of relationships that become an asset, especially for those in media relations.

Within each discipline, typical activities include publicity events, speaking opportunities, press releases, newsletters, blogs, social media, press kits, and outbound communication to members of the press. Video and audio news releases (VNRs and ANRs) are often produced and distributed to TV outlets in hopes they will be used as regular program content.

Audience targeting 
A fundamental technique used in public relations is to identify the target audience and to tailor messages that are relevant to each audience. Audience targeting requires public relations professionals to have a deep understanding of the needs and desires of the audience they are trying to appeal to. Sometimes the interests of differing audiences and stakeholders common to a public relations effort necessitate the creation of several distinct but complementary messages. These messages however should be relevant to each other, thus creating consistency in the overall message and theme. Audience targeting tactics are important for public relations practitioners because they face all kinds of problems: low visibility, lack of public understanding, opposition from critics, and insufficient support from funding sources.

On the other hand, stakeholder theory identifies people who have a stake in a given institution or issue. All audiences are stakeholders (or presumptive stakeholders), but not all stakeholders are members of a target audience. For example, if a charity commissions a public relations agency to create an advertising campaign to raise money to find a cure for a disease, the charity and the people with the disease are stakeholders, but the audience is anyone who is likely to donate money. Public relations experts possess deep skills in media relations, market positioning, and branding. They are powerful agents that help clients deliver clear, unambiguous information to a target audience that matters to them.

The public in public relations 
A public is any group whose members have a common interest or common values in a particular subject, such as a political party. Those members would then be considered stakeholders, which are people who have a stake or an interest in an organization or issue that potentially involves the organization or group they're interested in. The Publics in Public Relations are:

 Traditional Publics: Groups with which the individual has an ongoing and long-term relationship. These may include Employees, Media, Governments, Investors, and Customers
 Non-Traditional Publics: Groups that are typically unfamiliar with the organization and the individual has not had a relationship with but may become traditional publics due to changes in the organization, in society or if a group changing event occurs.
 Latent Publics: A group whose values have come into contact with the values of the organization but whose members haven't yet realized it; the members of that public are not yet aware of the relationship.
 Aware Publics: A group of members who are aware of the existence of a commonality of values or interests with the organization but have not organized or attempted to respond to that commonality.
 Intervening Publics: Any public that helps an individual send a message to another public, could be the media or someone with stature.
 Primary Publics: If a public can directly affect an organization's pursuit of its values-driven goals. This publics would include media, employees, government, shareholder, financial institutions, and the immediate community.
 Secondary Publics: Have high interest in the company such as the primary publics but will not be directly affected by decisions of the organization.
 Internal Publics: People within an organization
 External Publics: People outside of an organization
 Domestic Publics: Those within the country
 International Publics: Those outsides of the country and when communicating with these publics individuals must be wary of that areas culture, beliefs, values, ethic, and other valuable cultural difference as to not offend anyone.

Early literature authored by James Grunig (1978) suggested that publics develop in stages determined by their levels of problem recognition, constraint recognition and involvement in addressing the issue. The theory posited that publics develop in the following stages:

 Non-Publics: Share no issue with an organization.
 Latent Publics: Face an issue but do not recognize it.
 Apathetic Publics: Face an issue but do not care to address it.
 Aware Publics: Face an issue but are unorganized to mobilize against it.
 Active Publics: Face an issue and are organized to respond to it.

Messaging 
Messaging is the process of creating a consistent story around: a product, person, company, or service. Messaging aims to avoid having readers receive contradictory or confusing information that will instill doubt in their purchasing choices, or other decisions that affect the company. Brands aim to have the same problem statement, industry viewpoint, or brand perception shared across sources and media.

Social media marketing 

Digital marketing is the use of Internet tools and technologies such as search engines, Web 2.0 social bookmarking, new media relations, blogging, and social media marketing. Interactive PR allows companies and organizations to disseminate information without relying solely on mainstream publications and communicate directly with the public, customers and prospects.

PR practitioners have always relied on the media such as TV, radio, and magazines, to promote their ideas and messages tailored specifically to a target audience. Social media marketing is not only a new way to achieve that goal, but also a continuation of a strategy that existed for decades. Lister et al. said that "Digital media can be seen as a continuation and extension of a principal or technique that was already in place".
 
Social media platforms enable users to connect with audiences to build brands, increase sales, and drive website traffic. This involves publishing content on social media profiles, engaging with followers, analyzing results, and running social media advertisements. The goal is to produce content that users will share with their social network to help a company increase brand exposure and broaden customer reach. Some of the major social media platforms are currently Facebook, Instagram, Twitter, LinkedIn, Pinterest, YouTube, and Snapchat.

As digital technology has evolved, the methods to measure effective online public relations effectiveness have improved. The Public Relations Society of America, which has been developing PR strategies since 1947, identified 5 steps to measure online public relations effectiveness. 
 Engagement: Measure the number of people who engaged with an item (social shares, likes and comments). 
 Impressions: Measure the number of people who may have viewed an item.
 Items: Measure any content (blog posts, articles, etc.) that originally appeared as digital media.
 Mentions: Measure how many online items mention the brand, organization, or product.
 Reach: Measure how far the PR campaign managed to penetrate overall and in terms of a particular audience.

Types of public relations arenas 
Publicists can work in a host of different types of business verticals such as entertainment, technology, music, travel, television, food, consumer electronics and more. Many publicists build their career in a specific business space to leverage relationships and contacts. There are different kinds of press strategies for such as B2B (business to business) or B2C (business to consumer). Business to business publicity highlights service providers who provide services and products to other businesses. Business to Consumer publicizes products and services for regular consumers, such as toys, travel, food, entertainment, personal electronics and music.

Other techniques 
Litigation public relations is the management of the communication process during the course of any legal dispute or adjudicatory processing so as to affect the outcome or its effect on the client's overall reputation (Haggerty, 2003).

Ethics 
Public relations professionals both serve the public's interest and private interests of businesses, associations, non-profit organizations, and governments. This dual obligation gave rise to heated debates among scholars of the discipline and practitioners over its fundamental values. This conflict represents the main ethical predicament of public relations. In 2000, the Public Relations Society of America (PRSA) responded to the controversy by acknowledging in its new code of ethics "advocacy" – for the first time – as a core value of the discipline.

The field of public relations is generally highly un-regulated, but many professionals voluntarily adhere to the code of conduct of one or more professional bodies to avoid exposure for ethical violations. The Chartered Institute of Public Relations, the Public Relations Society of America, and The Institute of Public Relations are a few organizations that publish an ethical code. Still, Edelman's 2003 semi-annual trust survey found that only 20 percent of survey respondents from the public believed paid communicators within a company were credible. Individuals in public relations are growing increasingly concerned with their company's marketing practices, questioning whether they agree with the company's social responsibility. They seek more influence over marketing and more of a counseling and policy-making role. On the other hand, individuals in marketing are increasingly interested in incorporating publicity as a tool within the realm marketing.

According to Scott Cutlip, the social justification for public relations is the right for an organization to have a fair hearing of their point of view in the public forum, but to obtain such a hearing for their ideas requires a skilled advocate.

Marketing and communications strategist, Ira Gostin, believes there is a code of conduct when conducting business and using public relations. Public relations specialists have the ability to influence society. Fact-checking and presenting accurate information is necessary to maintain credibility with employers and clients.

Public Relation Code of Ethics 
The Public Relation Student Society of America has established a set of fundamental guidelines that people within the public relations professions should practice and use in their business atmosphere. These values are:

 Advocacy: Serving the public interest by acting as responsible advocates for the clientele. This can occur by displaying the marketplace of ideas, facts and viewpoints to aid informed public debate.
 Honesty: Standing by the truth and accuracy of all facts in the case and advancing those statements to the public.
 Expertise: To become and stay informed of the specialized knowledge needed in the field of Public Relations. Taking that knowledge and improving the field through development, research and education. Meanwhile, professionals also build their understanding, credibility, and relationships to understand various audiences and industries.
 Independence: Provide unbiased work to those that are represented while being accountable for all actions.
 Loyalty: Stay devoted to the client while remembering that there is a duty to still serve the public interest.
 Fairness: Honorably conduct business with any and all clients, employers, competitors, peers, vendors, media and general public. Respecting all opinions and right of free expression.

International Public Relations Code of Ethics 
Other than the ethics put in place in the United States of America there are also International ethics set to ensure proper and, legal worldwide communication. Regarding these ethics, there are broad codes used specifically for international forms of public relations, and then there are more specific forms from different countries. For example, some countries have certain associations to create ethics and standards to communication across their country.

The International Association of Business Communication (founded in 1971), or also known as IABC, has its own set of ethics in order to enforce a set of guidelines that ensure communication internationality is legal, ethical, and is in good taste. Some principles that members of the board of IABC follow include.

 Having proper and legal communication
 Being understanding and open to other people's cultures, values, and beliefs
 Create communication that is accurate, trusting, to ensure mutual respect and understanding

The IABC members use the following list of ethics in order to work to improve values of communication throughout the world:

 Being credible and honest
 Keeping up with information to ensure accuracy of communication
 Understanding free speech and respecting this right
 Having sensitivity towards other people's thoughts, beliefs, and way of life
 Not taking part in unethical behaviors
 Obeying policies and laws
 Giving proper cremation to resources used for communication
 Ensuring private information is protected (not used for personal gain) and if publicized, guarantee proper legal measures will be put in place.
 Publishers of said communication do not accept gifts, benefits, payments etc; for work, or their services
 Creating results and spreading results that are attainable and they can deliver.
 Being fully truthful to other people, and themselves.

Spin 

Spin has been interpreted historically to mean overt deceit that is meant to manipulate the public, but since the 1990s has shifted to describing a "polishing of the truth." Today, spin refers to providing a certain interpretation of information meant to sway public opinion. Companies may use spin to create the appearance of the company or other events are going in a slightly different direction than they actually are. Within the field of public relations, spin is seen as a derogatory term, interpreted by professionals as meaning blatant deceit and manipulation. Skilled practitioners of spin are sometimes called "spin doctors."

In Stuart Ewen's PR! A Social History of Spin, he argues that public relations can be a real menace to democracy as it renders the public discourse powerless. Corporations are able to hire public relations professionals and transmit their messages through the media channels and exercise a huge amount of influence upon the individual who is defenseless against such a powerful force. He claims that public relations is a weapon for capitalist deception and the best way to resist is to become media literate and use critical thinking when interpreting the various mediated messages.

According to Jim Hoggan, "public relations is not by definition 'spin'. Public relations is the art of building good relationships. You do that most effectively by earning trust and goodwill among those who are important to you and your business... Spin is to public relations what manipulation is to interpersonal communications. It's a diversion whose primary effect is ultimately to undermine the central goal of building trust and nurturing a good relationship."

The techniques of spin include selectively presenting facts and quotes that support ideal positions (cherry picking), the so-called "non-denial denial," phrasing that in a way presumes unproven truths, euphemisms for drawing attention away from items considered distasteful, and ambiguity in public statements. Another spin technique involves careful choice of timing in the release of certain news so it can take advantage of prominent events in the news.

Negative 

Negative public relations, also called dark public relations (DPR), 'black hat PR' and in some earlier writing "Black PR", is a process of destroying the target's reputation and/or corporate identity. The objective in DPR is to discredit someone else, who may pose a threat to the client's business or be a political rival. DPR may rely on IT security, industrial espionage, social engineering and competitive intelligence. Common techniques include using dirty secrets from the target, producing misleading facts to fool a competitor. In politics, a decision to use negative PR is also known as negative campaigning.

T.A.R.E.S. 
The T.A.R.E.S. is a five-point test that evaluates ethical persuasion and provides boundaries in persuasive practices.

 Truthfulness (of the message) examples
 Is this communicating something factually true and accurate?
 Does this downplay or diminish evidence?
 Am I creating a false narrative or image?
 Does this influence people to believe something that I do not believe myself?
 Authenticity (of the persuader) examples
 Will people question my honesty or integrity from this?
 Do I truly believe that what is being presented will benefit those who are reading?
 Do I support or advocate in the statement, person, or product?
 Respect (for the persuadee) examples
 Am I presenting statements in self-interest, or do I genuinely care about the issue, person, or product?
 Is this presented to persuadees who are rational, self-thinking beings?
 What ethical responsibility do I hold by presenting this information?
 Equity (of the persuasive appeal) examples
 Is this appeal fair and nondiscriminatory?
 Have I target persuadees who are not capable of understanding the claims and the context?
 Are the statements I present sensitive to various interests, needs, or concerns of the persuadees? 
 Social Responsibility (for the common good) examples
 Have I unfairly stereotyped groups of society in my statements or actions?
 Will my statements or actions cause harms to various groups of society?
 Will there be any negative consequences against a group in society based on my statements or actions? 
 Have I fairly presented issues that concern groups who may have been underrepresented in society? 
 Are the statements or actions that are being communicated responsible to various societal groups, public interest, and the public?

Politics and civil society 
In Propaganda (1928), Bernays argued that the manipulation of public opinion was a necessary part of democracy. In public relations, lobby groups are created to influence government policy, corporate policy or public opinion, typically in a way that benefits the sponsoring organization.

In fact, Bernays stresses that we are in fact dominated in almost every aspect of our lives, by a relatively small number of persons who have mastered the 'mental processes and social patterns of the masses,’ which include our behavior, political and economic spheres or our morals. In theory, each individual chooses his own opinion on behavior and public issues. However, in practice, it is impossible for one to study all variables and approaches of a particular question and come to a conclusion without any external influence. This is the reason why the society has agreed upon an 'invisible government' to interpret on our behalf information and narrow the choice field to a more practical scale.

When a lobby group hides its true purpose and support base, it is known as a front group. Front groups are a form of astroturfing, because they intend to sway the public or the government without disclosing their financial connection to corporate or political interests. They create a fake grass-roots movement by giving the appearance of a trusted organization that serves the public, when they actually serve their sponsors.

Politicians also employ public relations professionals to help project their views, policies and even personalities to their best advantages.

See also 

 Edward Bernays
 Brand management
 Grassroots
 Impression management
 List of press release agencies
 List of public relations journals
 Media intelligence
 Media manipulation
 Promotion (marketing)
 Propaganda
 Public relations in India
 Publicist
 Reputation laundering
 Reputation management

Notes

References

Further reading 

 

 
 
 
 Kelleher, T. (2018). Public Relations (1st ed.). New York, NY: Oxford University Press.
 Stoykov, Lubomir (2016). Public Relations Management (2nd ed.). Sofia: Alma communication.

 
Communication design
Business ethics